Frutidella is a genus of lichen-forming fungi in the family Ramalinaceae. It contains three species. The genus was circumscribed in 1994 by Klaus Kalb to contain the species formerly known as Lecidea caesioatra.

Species
Frutidella caesioatra 
Frutidella furfuracea 
Frutidella pullata

References

Ramalinaceae
Lichen genera
Lecanorales genera
Taxa named by Klaus Kalb
Taxa described in 1994